Ulysses Grant Groff (29 October 1865 – 15 October 1950) was a large landowner and philanthropist noted for substantial donations to the City of Amherst, Massachusetts and to Amherst College.

He was born in Lancaster County, Pennsylvania to plantation owner John Groff and Susan Beaver (née Susan de Bouvoir) and married Julia Page Quick, the daughter of the Anglican Bishop of Philadelphia in Germantown, Pennsylvania on 14 March 1888.

In 1890 during a period of strong industrial growth, he relocated to Amherst, Massachusetts in order to develop what was at the time a large-scale farming enterprise. Despite the Great Depression, his enterprise fared exceptionally well compared to others, and he soon became a major landowner in Amherst. Upon reaching retirement age, he downscaled his holdings and donated large portions to the Town of Amherst and to Amherst College.

Ulysses Grant Groff died in an automobile accident in Massachusetts two weeks before his 85th birthday.

He was the father of real estate developer and businessman Charles Wister Groff.

References

 Best, Jane Evans. The Groff Book. Masthoff Press, Pennsylvania, 1997.
 The McKouwn Almanac. Sept McKouwn. Dublin 2005 (National Library of Ireland).

1865 births
1950 deaths
American real estate businesspeople
American philanthropists
American people of Swiss descent
People from Amherst, Massachusetts
People from Lancaster County, Pennsylvania
Road incident deaths in Massachusetts